William Rose Benét (February 2, 1886 – May 4, 1950) was an American poet, writer, and editor. He was the older brother of Stephen Vincent Benét.

Early life and education
He was born in Brooklyn, New York, the son of Col. James Walker Benét and his wife, Frances Neill (née Rose), and grandson of Brigadier General Stephen Vincent Benét. He was educated The Albany Academy in Albany, NY and at Sheffield Scientific School of Yale University, graduating with a Ph.B. in 1907. At Yale, he edited and contributed light verse to campus humor magazine The Yale Record. 

Benét came to California in 1909 where his father was stationed as a commander of the Benicia Arsenal in Benicia. He arrived at the Carmel-by-the-Sea writers' colony and stayed with, roommate and fried, Sinclair Lewis. Lewis and Benét left Carmel after six months.

Career
He began the Saturday Review of Literature in 1924 and continued to edit and write for it until his death.

In 1942, he was awarded the Pulitzer Prize for Poetry for his book of autobiographical verse, The Dust Which Is God (1941). His brother Stephen Vincent Benét was awarded the same prize two years later in 1944.

Benét is also the author of The Reader's Encyclopedia, a standard American guide to world literature.

Today he is perhaps best known as the author of "The Skater of Ghost Lake," a poem frequently assigned in American schools for its use of onomatopoeia and rhythm as well as its tone of dark mystery.

Personal life
Benét married four times. First, on September 3, 1912, he married Teresa Frances Thompson, with whom he had three children (James Walker Benét (1914-2012), Frances Rosemary Benét, and Kathleen Anne Benét). Teresa died in 1919.
Benét's second wife, whom he married on October 5, 1923, was poet Elinor Wylie. She died in 1928.
Benét's third wife, whom he married on March 15, 1932, was Lora Baxter. They divorced in 1937. 
Benét's fourth wife, and widow, was children's writer Marjorie Flack. They were married from June 22, 1941, until his death in 1950.

Benét's son, James Walker Benét, fought in the Abraham Lincoln Brigade and was the author of two suspense novels and a guidebook to the San Francisco Bay Area.

Works
 Merchants of Cathay (1913)
 The Great White Wall: A Poem (1916)
 Perpetual Light: A Memorial (1919)
 Moons of Grandeur: A Book of Poems (1920)
 Dry Points: Studies in Black and White (1921)
 The Flying King of Kurio: A Story of Children (1926)
 Wild Goslings: A Selection of Fugitive Pieces (1927)
 Starry Harness (1933)
 Pocket University: Guide to Daily Reading (1934)
 Golden Fleece: A Collection of Poems and Ballads Old and New (1935)
 Great Poems of the English Language (1936)
 Mother Goose: A Comprehensive Collection of the Rhymes (1936)
 Mad Blake: A Poem (1937)
 Day of Deliverance: A Book of Poems in Wartime (1940)
 The Dust Which is God: A Novel in Verse (1941)
 The Stairway of Surprise: Poems (1947)
 Timothy's Angels, Verse (1947)
  The Spirit of the Scene (1951)
 The First Person Singular (1971)
 The Prose and Poetry of Elinor Wylie (1974)

References

Bulletin of Yale University, Obituary Record of Graduate of the Undergraduate Schools Deceased During the Year 1949–1950, series 47, number 109, 1 January 1951, page 170–1.

External links
 
 
 
  
 
  Perpetual Light by William Rose Benet
 William Rose Benét Papers. Yale Collection of American Literature, Beinecke Rare Book and Manuscript Library.
 Hervey Allen Papers, 1831-1965, SC.1952.01, Special Collections Department, University of Pittsburgh
 

1886 births
1950 deaths
American people of Catalan descent
Poets from New York (state)
Pulitzer Prize for Poetry winners
20th-century American poets
The Yale Record alumni
Yale School of Engineering & Applied Science alumni
The Albany Academy alumni
Members of the American Academy of Arts and Letters